"Sweet Dreams" or "Sweet Dreams (of You)" is a country ballad, which was written by Don Gibson. Gibson originally recorded the song in 1955; his version hit the top ten of Billboard's country chart, but was eclipsed by the success of a competing version by Faron Young. In 1960, after Gibson had established himself as a country music superstar, he released a new version as a single. This version also charted in the top ten on the country chart and also crossed over to the Billboard Hot 100, where it peaked at number ninety-three. The song has become a country standard, with other notable versions by Patsy Cline and Emmylou Harris.

Chart performance

Faron Young version
In the summer of 1956 Faron Young recorded "Sweet Dreams" and took it all the way to #2 on the country charts.  It was this version that garnered Gibson his first recognition as a talented songwriter.

Chart performance

Patsy Cline version

In early 1963, Patsy Cline was recording songs for her next  album, Faded Love, which was set for release in late March, 1963. She recorded "Sweet Dreams" for the album on February 5. However, on March 5, Cline died in a plane crash upon returning home from a benefit in Kansas City, Missouri for the family of Cactus Jack Call, a disc jockey who was killed in an automobile accident; therefore, the album was never released. The songs were later compiled for the release Patsy Cline the Last Sessions in 1988.

Instead, Decca Records issued a double album, entitled The Patsy Cline Story, in the summer of 1963.

In 1963, "Sweet Dreams" was released to the public and became a big crossover hit, making it to #5 on the country charts and to #44 on the pop music charts. It also peaked on the U.S. Adult Contemporary charts at #15. This song was followed by another which was planned for release on Cline's upcoming album: "Faded Love", which became a #7 hit.

It was said that Cline did not like the use of the violins that producer Owen Bradley was bringing into the song because she feared she was becoming too "pop" for her country audience. But upon hearing the song after the playbacks the night she recorded it, she supposedly held a record up of her first record and "Sweet Dreams" and proclaimed "Well, here it is: The first and the last." This quote came from the video called Remembering Patsy, and was quoted by Jan Howard whose husband at the time was Harlan Howard.

In 1985, the song became the title tune of a Patsy Cline biopic starring Jessica Lange as Cline. Cline's hit version of "Sweet Dreams" was included on the film's soundtrack, along with "Crazy," "She's Got You," and many of her other songs. The song also featured in Martin Scorsese's 2006 movie The Departed, Asif Kapadia's 2006 movie The Return, and The Coen Brothers' film Blood Simple.

Chart performance

Tommy McLain version
The version to experience the most success on Billboard's pop charts is the one recorded by Tommy McLain. This version, released as a single in 1966, is the only one to have entered the top 40.

Chart history

Emmylou Harris version

Emmylou Harris' 1975 recording of the song was the most successful version on Billboard'''s country charts to date. The song first appeared on Harris' album Elite Hotel, and was released as the album's third single in the fall of 1976, reaching number one in December.

Reba McEntire version

Entertainer Reba McEntire recorded her version on Out of a Dream, her second album, in 1979. "Sweet Dreams" gave her her first solo top 20 hit, peaking at #19 on the Hot Country Songs chart. For many years until March 15, 1991, McEntire closed her concerts with an a cappella version of the song.

Chart performance

Other versions
The song was also featured on the Tammy Wynette album D-I-V-O-R-C-E and on the Elvis Costello & The Attractions 1981 album Almost Blue.

In 1986, "Sweet Dreams" was featured on the Mekons album "The Edge of the World".

Many instrumental versions have been recorded of this song. Ace Cannon first recorded it for his 1965 album Nashville Hits and subsequently recorded at least two more versions. Another version was by Roy Buchanan on his 1972 album Roy Buchanan, which also plays during the closing of the Martin Scorsese film The Departed.  

Chet Atkins and Mark Knopfler recorded one in 1990 on their album Neck and Neck on Columbia Records, and in 1997 the band Hellecasters also covered it on their Return of the Hellecasters, featuring Jerry Donahue, John Jorgenson, and Will Ray.

In 1980, "Sweet Dreams" was part of the soundtrack for the Loretta Lynn biopic Coal Miner's Daughter'' and was sung by Beverly D'Angelo, who portrayed Patsy Cline.

References

1960 singles
1963 singles
1966 singles
1976 singles
1979 singles
Don Gibson songs
Emmylou Harris songs
Faron Young songs
Patsy Cline songs
Reba McEntire songs
Songs written by Don Gibson
Song recordings produced by Owen Bradley
Song recordings produced by Jerry Kennedy
Decca Records singles
Reprise Records singles
Mercury Records singles
1956 songs
1950s ballads